Mok is a surname in various cultures. It may be a transcription of several Chinese surnames in their Cantonese or Teochew pronunciations, a Dutch surname, a Hungarian surname, or a Korean surname.

Origins

Mok may transcribe the pronunciation, in different varieties of Chinese, of some Chinese surnames spelled as Mo or Mu in Pinyin (which reflects the Mandarin Chinese pronunciation), including:

Mò, spelled Mok based on its pronunciation in Cantonese or Teochew.
Mù, homophonous with the first surname above in Teochew. According to Patrick Hanks, some Cantonese speakers in the United Kingdom and the United States also spell this name as Mok, though Muk is probably a more common transcription of the Cantonese pronunciation.
Mù, homophonous with the first surname above in Teochew.
Mù, homophonous with the first surname above in Teochew.
 
The Dutch surname Mok is a variant spelling of Mock. The surname Mock might have originated from Moch, a clipping of Mochel.

The Hungarian surname Mók was originally a given name. That given name might be a hypocorism of Mózes, which is the Hungarian form of the given names Moises or Moses. 

There is only one hanja used to write the modern Korean surname Mok: , meaning 'harmonious'. That clan is so named for its bon-gwan (clan hometown) of Sacheon, South Gyeongsang Province, a city which became part of South Korea after the division of the Korean peninsula. Historically, another hanja meaning 'tree' had also been used as a surname by the Mok clan of Baekje, but this surname is no longer extant in the Korean peninsula.

Statistics
In the Netherlands, there were 421 people with the surname Mok as of 2007, up from 112 in 1947.

The 2000 South Korean Census found 8,191 people in 2,493 households with the surname Mok; all but ten of those people stated that they were members of the Sacheon Mok clan.

According to statistics cited by Patrick Hanks, there were 450 people on the island of Great Britain and nine on the island of Ireland with the surname Mok as of 2011; no bearers of the surname were recorded in Great Britain in 1881.

The 2010 United States Census found 2,707 people with the surname Mok, making it the 11,597th-most-common name in the country. This represented an increase from 2,134 (13,137th-most-common) in the 2000 Census. In both censuses, about nine-tenths of the bearers of the surname identified as Asian, and five percent as White.

People

Cambodian surname 
Mok Mareth (born 1948), Cambodian politician
Theavy Mok (born 1963), Cambodian plastic surgeon

Chinese surname 

Mok Kwai-lan (1892–1982), fourth spouse of Lingnan martial arts grandmaster Wong Fei-hung
Mok Chun Wah (born 1929), Hong Kong footballer
Mok Cheuk Wing (born 1949), Hong Kong judo athlete
Mok Ying-fan (born 1951), Hong Kong politician
Ngaiming Mok (born 1956), Hong Kong mathematician
Warren Mok (born 1958), Macau operatic tenor
Max Mok (born 1960), Hong Kong actor
Mok Ka Sha (born 1962), Hong Kong table tennis player
Charles Mok (born 1964), Hong Kong internet entrepreneur and politician
Hoyan Mok (born 1969), Hong Kong actress who won the 1993 Miss Hong Kong Pageant
Karen Mok (born 1970), Hong Kong actress and pop singer
Patricia Mok (born 1971), Singaporean actress
Rosanda Mok (born 1972), Hong Kong politician
Zandra Mok (born 1973), Hong Kong television reporter and politician
Monica Mok (born 1983), Beijing-born Australian actress
Mok Ying Ren (born 1988), Singaporean triathlete and long-distance runner
Mok Hing Ling, Chinese modern ink painter
May Mok, Hong Kong sound effects editor
Philip Mok, Hong Kong professor of electrical engineering

Korean surname 
Mok Jin-seok (born 1980), South Korean Go player
Mok Un-ju (born 1981), North Korean gymnast
Yebin Mok (born 1984), South Korean-born American figure skater

Other or unknown
Abraham Mok (1888–1944), Dutch gymnast murdered in the Holocaust
Jack Mok (born 1935), South African rower
Clement Mok (born 1958), Canadian graphic designer
Ken Mok (born 1961), American television producer
Al Mok, American computer scientist
Desmond Mok, Papua New Guinean rugby league player
Judith Mok, Dutch soprano

References

External links
Mok on the "Genealogy" section of DutchJewry.org

Chinese-language surnames
Dutch-language surnames
Hungarian-language surnames
Korean-language surnames
Jewish surnames
Multiple Chinese surnames

Cantonese-language surnames